Chaudhary Ranbir Singh University (CRSU), formerly Kurukshetra University Post Graduate Regional Centre, is a state university in the city of Jind, Haryana, India. Established by the state Legislature Act 28 of 2014 on 24 July.

History

Chaudhary Ranbir Singh University was established as Kurukshetra University Post Graduate Regional Centre in August 2007. The university was established by Government of Haryana vide an ordinance on 4 July 2014. The university was inaugurated on 25 July 2014 and recognized by the University Grants Commission as a State University.

See also
 State University of Performing And Visual Arts
 State Institute of Film and Television
 University Grants Commission

References

External links
 

2014 establishments in Haryana
Educational institutions established in 2014
Universities in Haryana
Jind